"So Much Like My Dad" is a song first recorded by Willie Nelson on his 1986 album Partners.  American country music artist George Strait released the song in June 1992 as the second single from his album Holding My Own. The song reached number 3 on the Billboard Hot Country Singles & Tracks chart in October 1992.  The song was written by Chips Moman and Bobby Emmons.

Content
This slow to mid-tempo song takes a look at the relationship between a father and a son. The narrator actually plays the part of the son begging his mom for assistance. He wants to know what his dad always said to make his mom stay because his lover is going to leave him.

Critical reception
Deborah Evans Price, of Billboard magazine reviewed the song favorably, calling it an "elaborate and emotional production during which Strait's vocal is remarkably effective."

Chart performance
"So Much Like My Dad" debuted at number 60 on the U.S. Billboard Hot Country Singles & Tracks for the week of July 11, 1992.

Year-end charts

References

1992 singles
Willie Nelson songs
George Strait songs
Songs written by Chips Moman
Song recordings produced by Jimmy Bowen
MCA Records singles
Songs written by Bobby Emmons
1986 songs